"Tragedy's a' Comin'" is the first single from Green Naugahyde, the seventh studio album by rock band Primus. It marked the band's first new material since 2003's Animals Should Not Try to Act Like People EP. It is their first single in 12 years.

Green Naugahyde is the first Primus album to feature the trio of bassist/vocalist Les Claypool, guitarist Larry LaLonde and drummer Jay Lane who originally left Primus in 1988 before their Suck On This debut set.

Music video
A music video debuted on the internet soon after the single was released.

Three music videos have been released to promote the album. The first was made for Tragedy's a' comin', co-directed by Claypool and Mark Kohr, who had previously directed a number of the band's videos in the early 1990s. It was filmed on location at the Anchor & Hope restaurant in downtown San Francisco, and depicts kitchen staff preparing lobsters which are then served to diners by the maître d’, played by Kohr. The scene is keenly observed by one of the lobsters waiting to be cooked, and intercut with a fantasy sequence of that lobster imagining itself alone on a remote beach, played by Claypool. Throughout the video, an anonymous figure is shown riding a horse while wearing a space suit, who eventually arrives at the restaurant and orders the lobster, which is then cooked and served to them. Other scenes include some of the restaurant's diners spontaneously breaking out into dance, joined by the maître d’, and footage of the band members playing their instruments individually, each superimposed with stylised outlines of the other members animated over a panning photograph of more lobsters.

Claypool said of the video, 
 The video premiered on November 17, 2011 via the Independent Film Channel website, before being uploaded to Primus' official YouTube channel on December 14.

Meaning
Claypool told Spin magazine the song's subject matter describes the end of the world: "Lyrically, this is me focusing on eventual demise or at least the notion that big rain is coming and at some point I'm going to get pretty fucking wet."

Claypool told MusicRadar why he discussed such a dark subject matter with humor on this song:

Review
Paste magazine had the following to say about the new single:

"This will be our last (and most direct) stop in Antipop land for a while. This bit of ska-metal could be the sequel to “Ballad of Bodacious”. Claypool sometimes works against himself with such a heavy flange effect on his bass, but I understand how sometimes you need your bass to sound like a guitar when you’re playing riffs. Here, he goes back and forth from the clean funky pops during the main theme and bridge, to a flange-drench for the verse and chorus. This song doesn’t seem to be about tragedy in the big picture sense, so much as some low-life named Tragedy who is indeed on his way over."

Charts

See also
 Green Naugahyde
 Les Claypool
 Larry Lalonde
 Jay Lane

References

Primus (band) songs
Interscope Records singles
2011 singles
2011 songs
Songs written by Les Claypool
Songs written by Larry LaLonde
Songs written by Jay Lane